The 1st Army Corps was one of the main formations of the Armed Forces of South Russia (ВСЮР; VSUR) during the Russian Civil War. Formed in November 1918, it was first established as part of a reorganization of the White movement's Volunteer Army.

History 
On 16 April 1920, it was organized from the remnants of the Volunteer Army (known as the Volunteer Corps) in Crimea when Pyotr Wrangel reorganized the White forces in Crimea, known as the Russian Army, into numbered army corps. The Volunteer Corps included all non-Cossack units evacuated from Novorossiysk by the end of March.

Order of Battle 
The 1st Army Corps was the strongest of the four army corps, and was commanded by Alexander Kutepov. It included:

 the Kornilov Division
 the Drozdovsky Division
 the Markov Division
 the small Separate Cavalry Brigade (redesignated the 2nd Cavalry Division on 28 April)
 the 1st Separate Heavy Artillery Battalion
 the 1st Separate Positional Artillery Battalion (formed from the headquarters of the Alekseyev Artillery Brigade)
 a Separate sapper company
 the 5th Separate Telegraph Company.

Reorganisation

July 

On 7 July, the 6th Infantry Division joined the corps, and the 2nd Cavalry Division was transferred to the Cavalry Corps.

September 
On 4 September, it became part of the new 1st Army when Wrangel split the Russian Army into two armies. Kutepov took command of the 1st Army, and Pyotr Pisaryev became corps commander.

Operational history 
During its attacks in northern Taurida, the corps lost 23% of its strength in three days.

Known commanders
Lieutenant General Boris Kasanovich (15 November 1918 − 13 January 1919)
Lieutenant General Alexander Kutepov (13 January 1919 − August 1920)
Lieutenant General Pyotr Pisaryev (August 1920 − December 1920)
Lieutenant General Vladimir Vitkovsky (from 8 December 1920)

References

Citations

Bibliography

Sources
 Levitov M. N. Kornilovites in action, summer-autumn 1919
 Larionov V. A. To Moscow
 Trushnovich A. R. Memoirs of a Kornilovite (1914−1934)
 Turkul A. V. Pictures of the Civil War, 1918−1920
 Historian S. V. Volkov's site. Russian officers and the White movement

Military units and formations of White Russia (Russian Civil War)